Walnut Grove Methodist Church is a historic church in rural western Pulaski County, Arkansas.  It is located southwest of Little Rock, on the east side of Walnut Grove Road between County Roads 38 and 31.  It is a modest single-story wood-frame structure, with a gabled roof, rough-cut clapboard siding, and vernacular Greek Revival detailing.  Its interior is finished with wooden planking, and it retains original period pews of similarly simple construction.  Built in 1885, it is the oldest church in Pulaski County.

The church was listed on the National Register of Historic Places in 1977.

See also
National Register of Historic Places listings in Pulaski County, Arkansas

References

Methodist churches in Arkansas
Churches on the National Register of Historic Places in Arkansas
Churches completed in 1885
Churches in Pulaski County, Arkansas
National Register of Historic Places in Little Rock, Arkansas
1885 establishments in Arkansas